Pseudomyrophis atlanticus is an eel in the family Ophichthidae (worm/snake eels). It was described by Jacques Blache in 1975. It is a marine, tropical eel which is known from the eastern Atlantic Ocean (from which its species epithet is derived), including Senegal and Angola.

References

Fish described in 1975
atlanticus